On January 30, 1889, Governor Edward Stevenson of the Idaho Territory signed the territorial legislature's Council Bill No. 20, which officially established the UI as the upcoming state's land-grant institution.  Nearly four years later, the university opened for classes on October 3, 1892.
The choice of location for the University of Idaho was an "Olive Branch of Peace" by Gov. Stevenson for his actions in styming the nearly successful effort to detach the north Idaho Panhandle and join the state of Washington.

1800s 
 1889 - Beta Sigma established as first sorority
 1896 - first four undergraduate degrees awarded to:
 Stella Maude Allen, Florence May Corbett, Charles Luther Kirtley, and Arthur Prentis Adair.  - (photo)
 1898 - first graduate degree awarded
 UI Alumni Association established
 1899 - UI opens first summer school in Northwest - June 21 - (photo)

1900s 
 1901 - College of Agriculture established
 original Engineering Building opens (originally Applied Science, then Mines, then Engineering) - (photo-1) - (photo-2) - demolished in 1951 (unsafe), on site of present Niccolls Building (Home Economics, opened 1952)
 1902 - Ridenbaugh Hall completed - (photo-1) - (photo-2)
 Department of Domestic Science (later Home Economics) established; first in Pacific Northwest - June 11 (photo)
 1904 - present Art & Architecture South building completed; originally a gymnasium & armory - (photo) became Women's Gym in 1928, remodeled for A&A in 1976
 1905 - First National Greek organization in Idaho (Kappa Sigma), arrives on September 30
 1906 - original Administration Building (photo-1) (photo-2) burns down - March 30  - (photo) - remains later dynamited -  (photo)
 Metallurgical Lab completed, became Mines (1950), Psychology (1961), A&A (2001) - Pine St. - (photo-left) - (photo-right)
 Assay Building completed - (later Geology), 1955-84 gallery & museum, demolished in 1984 for Life Sciences North (Gibb Hall)
 1907 - Morrill Hall completed - (photo-1) - (photo-2) - financed with insurance funds from destroyed Admin bldg. - (originally for Agriculture, then Forestry in 1950) - Idaho Ave @ Pine St.
 College of Engineering established in cooperation with the College of Mines
 construction of new Administration Building begins
 1908 - Olmsted Brothers develop master plan for UI campus
 1909 - new Administration Building opens (Tudor Gothic) - (later photo)
 1910 - Arboretum begun by Charles H. Shattuck, head of forestry department -  (photo)
 1911 - Theodore Roosevelt spoke at the new Admin. Bldg on April 9 - (photo-1) -  (photo-2) on a platform built of Palouse wheat
 College of Engineering formally established - October 27
 1912 - North wing of Admin. Building completed -  (photo-1) - (photo-2) - (photo-3) -  (photo-4)includes auditorium - (first two floors)
 Hec Edmundson finishes seventh in 800 m at the Olympics
 1914 - Football games moved to MacLean Field, west of Admin. Building; previously at Main & E streets (SW corner) in north Moscow
 1916 - South wing of Admin. Building initially completed, extended in 1936 for library
 1920 - School of Education established - June 7
 Lindley Hall (first dormitory) opens in September - occupied site east of Life Sciences North (Gibb Hall),SW corner of Idaho & Ash; condemned in 1971, demolished in 1973
 1922 - UI joins Pacific Coast Conference - member until mid-1959 when PCC disbands
 1923 - current Continuing Education Bldg completed; originally Forney Hall (women's dorm) - (photo-1) - (photo-2)
 1924 - current Life Sciences South building completed, originally "Science Building" - (photo) - (photo-left)
 1925 - School of Business created; first dean is Harrison Dale.
 1927 - current Alumni Center completed, originally Hays Hall (women's dorm) - (photo)
Football team ties for PCC title
 current steam plant bldg completed - NE corner of 6th & Line St.
 1928 - Memorial Gymnasium completed - honors state's World War I service - (photo-1) - (photo-2) - (photo-3)
 1930 - fourth floor added to Morrill Hall
Fight song Go, Vandals, Go composed by freshman class vice president J. Morris O'Donnell
 1936 - Student Union Building (SUB) established after purchase of Blue Bucket Inn - (photo - 1924 constr.) - (photo - 1950 add'n)
 Student Health Center completed, originally "Infirmary" - (photo)
 Brink Hall opened; originally Willis Sweet Hall (men's dorm), then Faculty Office Complex (FOC) East, until renamed in 1982.
 south wing (1916) of Admin. Building (1909) extended for library expansion - (UI Library completed in 1957)
 total enrollment at 2,568 in October
1937 - UI Golf Course opens (9 holes) (photo 1938) - second 9 holes opens in 1970 (5 holes at NW, 4 at E)
Neale Stadium completed - (earthen horseshoe - wood bleachers) (photo-1) - (photo-2), on site of Kibbie Dome
 1938 - Eleanor Roosevelt speaks at Memorial Gym - March 26
 Phinney Hall completed; originally Chrisman Hall (men's dorm) - (photo); FOC West until 1982.
 1940 - total enrollment at 2,686  
 1942 - Gauss ME Laboratory completed -  SE corner of 6th & Line St. - (original Kirtley Lab #1: Charles L. Kirtley was first UI engineering graduate, in first class of 1896, (photo), later a physician)
 1943 - Varsity football cancelled due to lack of turnout in fall, returns in 1945
 Food Research Bldg completed - (orig. Dairy bldg, photo), west side of Morrill Hall, NE corner Line St. & Idaho Ave.
 1945 - student radio station KUOI (655 KHz) goes on the air - November; became 89.3 MHz in 1968
total enrollment at 1,450 in fall
 1946 - Basketball team wins its final Northern Division title in PCC and first since 1923, loses deciding game in title series at California
 1948 - inaugural Borah Symposium on foreign policy
total enrollment of 3,683 in fall
 1950 - new Engineering Building (classrooms) - Janssen Engineering Classrom Building, named for Allen S. Janssen, Dean, College of Engineering (1946-1967), in 1951
 Agricultural Science building completed
 Johnson Electrical Engineering Laboratory completed - (originally Kirtley Lab #2)
 Administration Building Annex completed, later incorporated into Albertson (2002)
 1951 - Music building completed - (photo) - (renamed for Lionel Hampton in 1987) -
 original Mines, then Engineering Building, (1901) is demolished (unsafe) - (current site of Niccolls (Home Economics))
 resident undergraduate fees: $47.50 per semester 
 1952 -  Home Economics building completed - (now Niccolls, photo) on site of old Engineering Bldg. (1901–51, photo)
 1954 - boxing dropped as a varsity sport in June - (national co-champs with Gonzaga in 1950)
 Football team defeats Palouse neighbor Washington State, first win over Cougars in 29 years
 1955 - Gault-Upham Halls (men's dorms) dedicated  - October 15 (demolished in 2003)
 1956 - Gault Hall arson - 3 fatalities, 4th floor - October 19 - (photo)
 Arsonist was reporter for UI student newspaper Argonaut, responsible for other campus fires:convicted of second-degree murder and sentenced to 25 years, paroled in 1968, & died in 1980.
 total enrollment at 3,674 in fall 
 1957 - UI Library completed  - (photo) - dedicated Nov 2 - on former site of tennis courts - (library was housed in S. wing of Admin. Bldg)
 Park Village Apts. completed (married & graduate housing) - 3rd & Home St. - demolished 2002
 1958 - Two Vandals selected in top 50 of 1958 NFL Draft: Jerry Kramer (39th) & Wayne Walker (45th)
 1959 - Pacific Coast Conference disbands in spring; UI independent for 4 years, until Big Sky forms in 1963
 total enrollment at 3,906 in October
 1960 - resident undergraduate fees: $64.50 per semester; non-residents added $125.
 1961 - College of Mines building completed - (photo) - north of Morrill Hall
 1962 - UI awards its first doctoral degree in education to Florence Dorothy Aller (counseling and guidance)
 1963 - Wallace Complex dormitories (two S.wings, 4 floors each) & cafeteria completed
 Basketball team packs Northwest gyms and goes 20–6 with center Gus Johnson
 UI joins the new Big Sky Conference as a charter member, - retains university (later Division I) status for football with its non-conference schedule (all D-I) through 1977 (except for 1967 & 1968)
 campus radio station KUID-FM (91.7 MHz) goes on the air
 resident undergraduate fees: $82 per semester 
 1964 - Physical Sciences building completed - (renamed for Malcolm Renfrew in 1985)
 Baseball wins inaugural Big Sky title
 1965 - University Classroom Center (UCC) completed, east of library - closed 2003reconfigured as Teaching & Learning Center, reopened 2005
 Third wing (NE, 6 floors) of Wallace Complex dormitory completed
 campus KUID-TV (Ch.12) goes on the air - Idaho Public Television takes over station in 1982
 visitor information center opens at north entrance - (current police substation) - 3rd & Line St.
 UI joins Big Sky for football after six seasons as independent, but retains university division status
 enrollment at 4,817 in February
 resident undergraduate fees: $100.50 per semester 
Ernest Hartung becomes 12th UI president in August 
 1966 - Art & Architecture (North) building completed (photo)
 Baseball wins second Big Sky title and advances to District 7 finals (Sweet Sixteen)
final season at MacLean Field (College of Education construction)
 1967 - President's Residence (S. side of Shattuck Arboretum) completed
 Wallace Complex dormitory's fourth & final wing (NW (Gooding), 6 floors) completed
 St. Augustine's Catholic Center opens - February - east of SUB
Baseball wins consecutive Big Sky titles, third in four years.
New baseball field opens in April, became Guy Wicks Field (dedicated 1969)
 NCAA downgrades UI football program, from university division to college division (two seasons)
 1968 - Buchanan Engineering Laboratory (BEL) completed - (CE, ChE, AgE, EE) - dedicated in May 1969
 resident undergraduate fees: $143 per semester 
 inaugural annual UI jazz festival - February - (renamed Lionel Hampton Jazz Festival in 1985)
 student radio station becomes KUOI-FM (89.3 MHz) at ten watts - November; (was 660 KHz)
 1969 - College of Education building completed - built on infield of MacLean baseball field
 Theophilus Tower (12-floor dormitory) completed (twin tower was cancelled)
 Golf course's new clubhouse is completed
 Baseball wins fourth Big Sky title and advances to District 7 finals (Sweet Sixteen); falls to eventual national champion Arizona State
 UI Wilderness Research Center established at Taylor Ranch field station,located in the Idaho Primitive Area (now the Frank Church-River of No Return Wilderness)
 NCAA restores UI football to university division after two seasons in college division
 Neale Stadium (1937) is condemned before football season; destroyed by arson after the season in November, - UI played its two Palouse home games at WSU's Rogers Field
total enrollment at 6,343 in fall
 1970 - Swim Center (photo) & Women's Gymnasium (P.E. Building) completed - (former center and right field of MacLean Field (baseball))
 fire destroys south grandstand of WSU's Rogers Field in April, WSU plays all its home football gamesat Spokane's Joe Albi Stadium, UI remains at Rogers Field with reduced capacity.
 Navy ROTC building (1942) firebombed in May (photo), day after Kent State shootings.
 South Hill Apartments opened - (married student housing) - first phase
 second nine holes at ASUI Golf Course (1937) opens in August (five holes @ NW, four @ E)
 1971 - College of Forestry Building completed (Natural Resources - 2000) - SW corner of 6th & Line St.
 addition to Agricultural Science Building (1950) is completed
 academic calendar begins two weeks earlier (September 2), with fall semester finals in December, instead of January
 new concrete football stadium opens October 9 with natural grass field, enclosed in 1975 to become Kibbie Dome;football team posts best record (8–3) to date and wins Big Sky title
 resident undergraduate fees: $173 per semester 
 1972 - Tartan Turf, similar to AstroTurf, installed in outdoor football stadium; new outdoor track facility holds first meet
 Skiing is dropped as a varsity sport in October
full-time enrollment (Moscow) at 7,118 in fall
UI president's salary increased to $31,400, highest on state payroll.
 1973 - College of Law Building completed, renamed in 1984 for Albert R. Menard
 Idaho is admitted to PCAA, request to leave the Big Sky Conference is denied by state board of education
 Lindley Hall (first dormitory - 1920) is demolished, was condemned in 1971 (east of Gibb Hall)
 1974 - "Performing Arts Center" opens in April; renamed for President Hartung in September 1977
 Big Sky Conference drops conference competition in five sports (baseball, skiing, golf, tennis, and swimming) in May
 1975 - new "Idaho Stadium" (1971) is enclosed after four years to become the Kibbie Dome - September
 arched roof and vertical end-walls completed for football home opener vs. Idaho State - September 27
 resident undergraduate fees: $190 per semester 
 1976 - first basketball game and track meet in Kibbie Dome - January 21 & 24
full-time enrollment (Moscow) at 6,517 in fall
Football team goes 7–4; senior center John Yarno named AP All-American,Yarno appears on Bob Hope's Christmas show (NBC) on December 13
 1977 - Richard Gibb becomes 13th UI president in July
 Student radio station KUOI-FM (89.3 MHz) becomes stereo, boosts power from ten to fifty watts
 1978 - UI football descends to the new Division I-AA (Big Sky football moves up from Division II).
 alumnus Don Monson (1955) hired as head coach of basketball team in August
 resident undergraduate fees: $219 per semester 
 1979 - total enrollment at 8,698 in fall.
 1980 - Baseball is dropped as a varsity sport in May, after over eighty years
 resident undergraduate fees: $245 per semester 
 1981 - Basketball team wins first Big Sky title and advances to NCAA tournament, finishes at 25–4.
 College of Art and Architecture is formed; first dean is Paul Blanton.
 Computer Science Department is formed.
 Dennis Erickson, age 34, hired in December, begins collegiate head coaching career at UI (1982–85)
 1982 - Basketball team ranked sixth, advances to NCAA Sweet Sixteen in March, finishes at 27–3.Don Monson named national coach of the year
 Kibbie Dome: East End Addition & composite roof project completed.
 Idaho Public Television takes over operation of KUID-TV
 Football team advances to Division I-AA quarterfinals; first-ever postseason appearance
 resident undergraduate fees: $408 per semester
 1983 - Agricultural Engineering building completed - (renamed "J.W. Martin" - 1990s) - 6th St. & Perimeter Rd.
 Total enrollment at 9,067 in spring
Core curriculum implemented in August (starting with class of 1987)
 1984 - KUID-FM (91.7 MHz) funding is cut by state legislature - acquired by KWSU & renamed KRFA
 Lionel Hampton's first appearance at the UI Jazz Festival - February
 University Gallery (Assay Building, 1906) demolished for construction of Life Sciences North (Gibb Hall)
 College of Law Building (1973) renamed for Albert R. Menard, Jr. (1918–93), former dean (1967–78) - (photo)
 1985 - women's swimming dropped as a varsity sport (returns in 2004)
 Jazz Festival renamed for Hampton
 Physical Sciences building (1964) renamed for Malcolm Renfrew
 resident undergraduate fees: $505 per semester 
 1986 - Life Sciences North building completed - (renamed for former President Gibb in 1993)
 men's swimming dropped as a varsity sport
 1987 - The School of Music is named after Lionel Hampton, becomes the Lionel Hampton School of Music
President Gibb's salary boosted by over 15%, to $77,928.
total enrollment at 8,280 in spring
 1988 - Football team achieves top ranking and advances to Division I-AA semifinals;quarterback John Friesz wins Walter Payton Award
 1989 - Elisabeth Zinser becomes 14th UI president; first female university president in state history
President's annual salary increased to $115,000.
 new UI bookstore opens in August, on former parking lot east of Student Union Building (SUB)
 resident undergraduate fees: $549 per semester 
 1990 - original Tartan Turf (1972) of Kibbie Dome is replaced; ground-anchored goalposts removed 
 Business Technology Incubator building completed - March - Sweet Ave. & S. Main St.
 campus post office station moved from library (lower NW corner) to new UI Bookstore building
 financial aid office moved to old UI bookstore, south of SUB
 1992 - UI receives its own zip code: 83844 - November
 resident undergraduate fees: $648 per semester 
 1993 - UI Library (1957) expanded by 50%, completed in fall - dedicated April 1994
 Life Sciences North (1986) renamed for Richard D. Gibb (1928–94), former UI president (1977–89)
Football team reaches Division I-AA semifinals
 1995 - student radio station KUOI-FM (89.3 MHz) boosts power from fifty to four hundred watts - January
College of Mines & Earth Resources' McClure Hall dedicated - September
 resident undergraduate fees: $810 per semester 
 total enrollment at 11,727 in fall
 1996 - UI joins Big West Conference for athletics, returns to Division I-A football after 18 years - July
 originally admitted in 1973, when conference was the PCAA, but denied by state board of education
 Robert Hoover becomes 15th UI president in July.
 outdoor track stadium (1972) named for new Olympic decathlon champion Dan O'Brien - September
 Engineering/Physics building dedicated - October 4
 Greenhouses on Sixth Street renovated and re-dedicated - November 1
 1998 - Vandal football team wins first Division I-A conference title and bowl game - (photo - town parade)
 women's soccer added as a varsity sport - fall
 Bill Chipman Palouse Trail to Pullman opens - April
 1999 - renovation of Gauss (1942) and Johnson (1950) engineering labs completed - November
 resident undergraduate fees: $1,068 per semester

2000s 
 2000 - Idaho Commons opens January 10, dedicated April 7 - east of UCC (now TLC)
 College of Forestry, Wildlife, & Range Sciences (FWR) is renamed - becomes College of Natural Resources (CNR)
 A doctored promotional photograph, where the faces of two minority students replaced the faces of white students, was found and removed from the website.
 2001 - Cowan Spectrum, an enclosed configuration for basketball in Kibbie Dome, debuts in February
 Big West drops football after 2000 -  UI becomes a "football only" member in Sun Belt for four seasons (2001–04)
 College of Agriculture is renamed - becomes College of Agricultural and Life Sciences (CALS)
 Agriculture Biotechnology Laboratory dedicated - October 28
 East entrance to campus completed - Sweet Ave. @ S. Main Street
 2002 - Student Recreation Center - April - north of Theophilus Tower dorm; formerly the site of maintenance buildings.
 Budget crisis forces reorganization of colleges - July 1
 Letters & Science splits into College of Science and College of Letters, Arts, & Social Science (CLASS).
 College of Mines & Earth Resources is eliminated, programs moved to either Science or Engineering
 J.A. Albertson building completed (College of Business & Economics) - dedicated October 24directly west of Admin. Building, incorporated Admin. Annex (1950)
 Park Village Apts. (1957) demolished (married & graduate housing) - 3rd & Home St.
 2003 - Living Learning Community - first 5 of 8 dormitories completed west of Line St., east of Theophilus Tower
 Gault-Upham dormitory (1955) is demolished, site now an open area west of Living Learning Community
 resident undergraduate fees: $1,522 per semester 
 2004 - Vandal Athletic Center - March 19, dedicated April 30 - enhancement of Kibbie Dome's East End Addition (1982).
 women's swimming reintroduced in fall - (orig. 1972-85) - Title IX balance for additional football scholarships in Div I-A
 final three units of Living Learning Center completed - former Gault-Upham dormitory (1955–2003) becomes open area
 Timothy P. White becomes 16th UI president in August, at an annual salary of $270,000.
 2005 - UI joins the Western Athletic Conference (WAC) for all sports - July 1
 infilled SprinTurf installed on varsity practice fields east of Kibbie Dome - August - replaced limited-use natural grass; - two fields, each  in length with a goal post, lighting, & fencing; now available for intramurals and recreation.
 Teaching & Learning Center opens, formerly the University Classroom Center (1965–2003)
 2007 - Kibbie Dome installs infilled "Real Grass Pro" - August - similar to FieldTurf, replaced the 1990 AstroTurf
 resident undergraduate fees: $2,100 per semester 
 2009 - first phase of safety improvements for Kibbie Dome (1975); west wall is replaced (wood to non-flammable translucent) and field-level exits are added.
 Football team defeats Bowling Green in Humanitarian Bowl
 senior left guard Mike Iupati named All-American, selected in first round (17th overall) in 2010 NFL Draft
 2010 - first chilled water tank constructed at golf course's fourth tee, SW corner of Nez Perce Drive and Perimeter Road. in height, volume of 
 2011 - Navy ROTC building (1942) damaged by accidental fire in June; razed in August 
 second phase of safety improvements to Kibbie Dome; east wall is replaced to match west wall (2009);new press box built above north grandstand, former press box above south grandstand is converted to premium seating (Litehouse Center)
 Dan O'Brien Track Stadium (1972) undergoes major renovation in preparation for hosting the WAC championships in spring 2012
 Ernesto Bustamante, assistant professor of psychology, killed graduate student Katy Benoit, then took his own life (August).
 2012 - During the vetting process in February, the State Board of Education removed the term "flagship" from the proposed mission statement because of a desire to not have comparative and competitive terms in mission statements.  Prior to this decision, higher education scholars and administrators outside the state considered UI to be the state's flagship university; it remains to be seen if the removal of the state's official designation will alter wider opinions.

 2013 - UI competes as FBS independent; WAC discontinued football after the 2012 season
 2014 - UI rejoins the Big Sky Conference for all sports except football, which rejoined the Sun Belt (last in 2004) - July 1
 resident undergraduate fees: $3,392 per semester (in fall)
 2016 - Sun Belt announces that neither the UI nor New Mexico State would be renewed after the 2017 football season,UI announces return to FCS and Big Sky for football in 2018 (last in 1995)
 UI Library (1957) completes a major renovation of the first floor
 resident undergraduate fees: $3,616 per semester (in fall)
 football team defeats Colorado State in Famous Idaho Potato Bowl
 2017 - Integrated Research and Innovation Center (IRIC) opens in January; on former site of Navy ROTC building.
 2018 - Football returns to Big Sky (and FCS)
 2019 - Groundbreaking for Idaho Central Credit Union Arena in June, north of Kibbie Dome's west end.
Alumnus C. Scott Green (1984) becomes 19th UI president in July, at an annual salary of $420,000.
 2021 - Idaho Central Credit Union Arena completed in late September.
 outdoor practice field east of Kibbie Dome renovated with a new AstroTurf RootZone 3D3 playing surface.
 resident undergraduate fees: $4,170 per semester (in fall)
 2022 - Four University of Idaho students are killed in an attack with an "edged weapon". The case has garnered national and international media attention. Bryan Christopher Kohberger was arrested in Albrightsville, Pennsylvania on December 30, 2022 and charged in connection to the killings.

References 

University of Idaho